Inje University (인제대학교) is a private university founded in 1932, located in Gimhae, South Korea. As of Aug, 2009, it had 874 faculty members, 230 staff members, 14,373 Undergraduate students and 1,458 Graduate students. The University has 8 colleges, 14 schools and 33 departments. The founding mission is to save the world through love and virtue. The educational goals are: to preserve nature; to value human lives and philanthropy. The school precepts are honesty, sincerity, and diligence.

History
It started as surgical clinic, "Paik Clinic" opened by Dr. In-Je Paik in 1932. He then donated all of his assets and founded Paik Hospital in 1946, the first civilian non-profit organization in Korea. In 1979 Inje Medical College opened, and in 1989 Inje College was promoted to Inje University, with Dr. Nakwhan Paik inaugurated as the first President of Inje University. Current, the 5th, president is Dr. Won-Ro Lee who was appointed in September 2010.

References

External links 
  

Inje University
Educational institutions established in 1979
Gimhae
1979 establishments in South Korea
Private universities and colleges in South Korea
Universities and colleges in South Gyeongsang Province
Universities and colleges in Busan